Chilean Civil War may refer to:

 Chilean Civil War of 1829–1830
 Chilean Civil War of 1891